Tharlo is a 2015 Chinese Tibetan-language comedy-drama film written and directed by Pema Tseden. It premiered in the Horizons section at the 72nd edition of the Venice Film Festival. It was released in China on December 9, 2016.

Plot 
Sheep herder Tharlo (Shide Nyima) or commonly known as "Ponytail" for his trademark hairstyle, goes to town to get an ID card photo as ordered by police chief Dorje (Tashi). Having lived all his life alone in the mountains, he is shocked to meet a modern young hairdresser Yangtso (Yang Shik Tso), who not only sports short hair but smokes. Yangtso flirts and even suggests travelling plans with him. Tharlo returns to the mountain but not for long. One day, due to his carelessness, his sheep are killed by wolves, which angers the sheep owner who not only scolds but slaps him repeatedly. Soon, Tharlo returns to town with stacks of cash from selling his sheep, places the money in front of and asks Yangtso to keep it. But his desire for a new life with her is dashed when he wakes up next morning to find her missing.

After failing to find her, Tharlo looks for chief Dorje at the police station. However, before he can reveal the intention of his visit, he is ordered to town again – to get a new ID card photo, by chief Dorje when he realises the "bald" Tharlo, who has shaven upon Yangtso's request, looks different from his new ID card's photo. Speechless, Tharlo slowly walks out of the police station and heads out to the mountain.

Cast   
 Shide Nyima as Tharlo
 Yang Shik Tso as Yangtso
 Tashi as Police chief Dorje
 Jinpa as Sheep owner 
 Dekyi Tserang as singer (Special appearance)

Reception

Box office 
The film grossed  at the Chinese box office.

Accolades

References

External links  

2015 comedy-drama films
Chinese comedy-drama films
Films directed by Pema Tseden
2015 comedy films